Anil Suri is a cancer researcher working in the field of Translational Cancer research at the National Institute of Immunology in New Delhi, India. He is a fellow of the Indian National Academy of Medical Sciences, a fellow of National Academy of Sciences, India, editorial board member of Cancer Research, vice president of the Indian Society for the Study of Reproduction and Fertility (ISSRF) and was an Executive Member of Indian Association of Cancer Research. 

Suri has been a visiting professor at Mount Sinai Medical Center, Memorial Sloan-Kettering Cancer Center, Weill Cornell Medical College, National Cancer Institute, Lombardi Comprehensive Cancer Centre at the Georgetown University Medical Center and Queen's University Belfast.

Cancer research
Suri discovered SPAG9, a novel cancer antigen that is expressed in the reproductive tract, breasts, and various other malignancies. Human clinical trials employing recombinant SPAG9 have been initiated in cervical cancer patients using dendritic cell-based vaccine at Adyar Cancer Institute (WIA), Chennai (“Cancer immunotherapy dendritic cell vaccine based immunotherapy in cervical cancer-A phase II, double blind, randomized, three arm study to evaluate the efficacy of dendritic cell vaccine in stage IIIB cervical cancer” (n=54 patients)” Protocol No. CI/MOL ONC/DC VACCINE Version 5.0).

He has one patents in India, the United States, Europe, Australia and Singapore, mostly related to siRNA and methods to diagnose cancer using antibodies and antigens.

He is involved in a cancer research program that aims to identify leads for early detection and diagnosis, treatments and cure. This involves biomarker discovery for early detection and diagnosis and cancer immunotherapy. The cancer biomarker candidates discovered by Dr. Suri in various cancers (including breast, ovarian, cervical, renal cell carcinoma, thyroid, bladder, colon and leukemia) have been published in prestigious international cancer journals.

Awards
Suri has received three awards from the ISSRF, the Post Graduate Institute of Medical Education and Research, two awards from the Indian Department of Biotechnology, the National Academy of Medical Sciences, and National Academy of Sciences.

Selected Publications

Cervical cancer
Small interfering RNA-mediated down regulation of Sperm-Associated Antigen 9 inhibits cervix tumor growth. Garg M, Kanojia D, Suri S, and Suri A. Cancer (journal). 2009. 
Sperm-Associated Antigen 9 (SPAG9) is a biomarker for early cervical carcinoma. Garg M, Kanojia D, Salhan S, Suri S, Gupta A, Lohiya NK, and  Suri A. Cancer (journal). 2009. 
Germ cell specific Heat shock protein 70-2 is expressed in cervical carcinoma and is involved in growth, migration and invasion of cervix cells. Garg M, D. Kanojia D, S. Saini S, S. Suri S, A. Gupta A, A. Surolia A, and A. Suri A. Cancer (journal). 2010. 
Gene silencing of A-kinase anchor protein 4 inhibits cervical cancer growth in vitro and in vivo. Saini S, Agarwal S, Sinha A, Verma A, Parashar D, Gupta N, Ansari AS, Lohiya NK, Jagadish N, Suri A. Cancer Gene Ther. 2013.

Breast cancer
Sperm Associated Antigen 9 (SPAG9), a novel biomarker for early detection of Breast Cancer. Kanojia D, Garg M, Gupta S, Gupta A, and Suri A. Cancer Epidemiology, Biomarkers & Prevention. 2009. 
A novel cancer testis antigen, A-kinase anchor protein 4 (AKAP4) is a potential biomarker for breast cancer. Saini S, Jagadish N, Gupta A, Bhatnagar A, Suri A. PLOS ONE. 2013

Ovarian cancer
Sperm Associated Antigen 9 (SPAG9), a novel Cancer testis antigen is potential target for Immunotherapy in epithelial ovarian cancer. Garg M, Chaurasiya D,  Rana R,  Jagadish N,  Kanojia D,  Dudha N,  Kamran N,  Salhan S,  Bhatnagar A,  Suri S,  Gupta A and  Suri A. Clinical Cancer Research.  2007. 
A novel cancer testis antigen, A-kinase anchor protein 4 (AKAP4) is a putative target for immunotherapy of ovarian serous carcinoma. Agarwal S, Saini S, Parashar D, Verma A, Sinha A, Jagadish N, Gupta A, Batra A, Suri S,  Bhatnagar A, Ansari AS,  Lohiya NK and Suri A. Oncoimmunology. 2013.

Renal cell carcinoma
Sperm Associated Antigen 9 is associated with tumor growth, migration and invasion in Renal cell carcinoma. Garg M, Kanojia D, Khosla A, Dudha N, Sati S, Chaurasiya D, Jagadish N, Seth A, Kumar R, Gupta S, Gupta A, K. Lohiya NK and Suri A. Cancer Research (journal) 2008.

Colorectal carcinoma
Sperm-associated antigen 9 is a novel biomarker for colorectal cancer and is involved in tumor growth and tumorigenicity. Kanojia D, Garg M, Gupta S, Gupta A, Suri A. American Journal of Pathology. 2011. 
A novel cancer testis antigen target A-Kinase Anchor Protein (AKAP4) for the early diagnosis and immunotherapy of colon cancer. Jagadish N, Parashar D, Gupta N, Agarwa S, Sharma A, Fatima R, Suri V, Kumar R, Gupta A, Lohiya NK, and Suri A. OncoImmunology. 2016. 
A-kinase anchor protein 4 (AKAP4) a promising therapeutic target of colorectal cancer. Jagadish N, Parashar D, Gupta N, Agarwal S, Purohit S, Kumar V, Sharma A, Fatima R, Topno AP, Shaha C, Suri A. J Exp Clin Cancer Res. 2015.

Salivary gland cancer
Sperm Associated Antigen 9 (SPAG9) expressions and humoral response in benign and malignant salivary gland tumors.  Agarwal S, Parashar D, Gupta N, Jagadish N, Thakar A, Suri V, Kumar R, Gupta A, Ansari AS, Lohiya NK, and Suri A. Oncoimmunology, 2014.

Thyroid cancer
Sperm-Associated Antigen 9, a novel diagnostic marker for Thyroid Cancer. Garg M, Kanojia D, Suri S, Gupta S,  Gupta A and  Suri A. Journal of Clinical Endocrinology & Metabolism. 2009.

Chronic myeloid leukemia
Sperm Associated Antigen 9 expression and humoral response in Chronic Myeloid Leukemia. Kanojia D, Garg M, Saini S, Agarwal S, Kumar R, Suri A. Leukemia Research. 2010.

References

Living people
Cancer researchers
Fellows of the National Academy of Medical Sciences
Fellows of The National Academy of Sciences, India
Year of birth missing (living people)